Ypsolopha yasudai is a moth of the family Ypsolophidae. It is known from Japan, Korea, north-eastern and central China and Russia.

The wingspan is 17–18 mm.

References

Ypsolophidae
Moths of Asia